The Alfa Romeo Abarth 2000 Coupe (also known as the Abarth-Alfa Romeo 2000 Coupe) is a one-off concept car produced by Abarth, in collaboration with Alfa Romeo, and designed by Ghia, in 1954.

History
The coupe was designed by Italian automotive designer Giovanni Savonuzzi, who based it on the design of the Alfa Romeo 1900 Super Sprint, and was later presented by Virgilio Conrero at the 1954 Turin and Paris Motor Shows. The engine is a two-valve per cylinder, Alfa Romeo 1975 cc four-cylinder, producing  @ 6,600 rpm, with a compression ratio of 8.5:1, and drives the rear wheels via a four-speed manual transmission. The car use a conventional front-engine, rear-wheel-drive layout, with the whole package weighing only .

References

Abarth vehicles
Alfa Romeo concept vehicles
Cars introduced in 1954
Sports cars
Rear-wheel-drive vehicles